Răzvan Alin Trif (born 9 October 1997) is a Romanian professional footballer who plays as a defender for Liga I club Universitatea Cluj.

Honours
Gaz Metan Mediaș
Liga II: 2015–16

References

External links
 
 

1997 births
Living people
People from Alba County
Association football defenders
Romanian footballers
Liga I players
CS Gaz Metan Mediaș players
CS Mioveni players
Liga II players
CS Luceafărul Oradea players
FC Universitatea Cluj players